Popa Mountain National Park is a national park in Myanmar covering . It was established in 1989. In elevation, it ranges from  surrounding Mount Popa in Kyaukpadaung Township, Mandalay Region.

References

National parks of Myanmar
Protected areas established in 1989